The year 1925 was marked by many events that left an imprint on the history of Soviet and Russian Fine Arts.

Events

 The Institute of Art Culture is transformed into the State Institute of Art Culture (GinKhuK). Kazimir Malevich, Vladimir Tatlin and Mikhail Matyshin work as a heads of its experimental studios.
 February 8 — The VII Exhibition of AKhRR named «Revolution, the everyday life and work» was opened in Moscow in the Pushkin Museum. Exhibited 375 works of painting and sculpture of 122 authors. The participants were Mikhail Avilov, Abram Arkhipov, Mikhail Bobyshov, Isaak Brodsky, Alexander Vakhrameev, Mitrofan Grekov, Nikolai Dormidontov, Yuly Klever, Piotr Kotov, Boris Kustodiev, Rudolf Frentz, and other important Russian artists.
 March 8 — The Exhibition «Woman in Russian painting» was opened in Moscow in Tretyakov gallery. The participants were Abram Arkhipov, Victor Vasnetsov, Alexander Golovin, Anna Golubkina, Natalia Goncharova, Boris Grigoriev, Nikolay Kasatkin, Konstantin Korovin, Boris Kustodiev, Filipp Malyavin, Vladimir Makovsky, Vasily Rozhdestvensky, Kuzma Petrov-Vodkin, Zinaida Serebriakova, and other important Russian artists.
 In Leningrad artist Pavel Filonov (1883–1941) organized a group of «Masters of Analytical Art».

Births
 February 9 — Yaroslav Krestovsky, Russian soviet painter (died 2004).
 June 15 — Vasily Golubev, Russian soviet painter (died 1985).
 December 16 — Kapitolina Rumiantseva, Russian soviet painter (died 2002).

See also

 List of Russian artists
 List of painters of Leningrad Union of Artists
 Saint Petersburg Union of Artists
 Russian culture
 1925 in the Soviet Union

References

Sources
 VII выставка картин и скульптуры «Революция, быт и труд. М., АХРР, 1925.
 VI выставка Общины художников. Каталог. Циркульные залы Академии художеств. Л., 1925.
 Каталог выставки заключительных работ студентов Ленинградской Академии художеств. Л., 1925.
 Выставка «Женщина в русской живописи». М., Государственная Третьяковская галерея, 1925.
 Artists of Peoples of the USSR. Biography Dictionary. Vol. 1. Moscow, Iskusstvo, 1970.
 Artists of Peoples of the USSR. Biography Dictionary. Vol. 2. Moscow, Iskusstvo, 1972.
 Directory of Members of Union of Artists of USSR. Volume 1,2. Moscow, Soviet Artist Edition, 1979.
 Directory of Members of the Leningrad branch of the Union of Artists of Russian Federation. Leningrad, Khudozhnik RSFSR, 1980.
 Artists of Peoples of the USSR. Biography Dictionary. Vol. 4 Book 1. Moscow, Iskusstvo, 1983.
 Directory of Members of the Leningrad branch of the Union of Artists of Russian Federation. - Leningrad: Khudozhnik RSFSR, 1987.
 Персональные и групповые выставки советских художников. 1917-1947 гг. М., Советский художник, 1989.
 Artists of peoples of the USSR. Biography Dictionary. Vol. 4 Book 2. - Saint Petersburg: Academic project humanitarian agency, 1995.
 Link of Times: 1932 - 1997. Artists - Members of Saint Petersburg Union of Artists of Russia. Exhibition catalogue. - Saint Petersburg: Manezh Central Exhibition Hall, 1997.
 Matthew C. Bown. Dictionary of 20th Century Russian and Soviet Painters 1900-1980s. - London: Izomar, 1998.
 Vern G. Swanson. Soviet Impressionism. - Woodbridge, England: Antique Collectors' Club, 2001.
 Время перемен. Искусство 1960—1985 в Советском Союзе. СПб., Государственный Русский музей, 2006.
 Sergei V. Ivanov. Unknown Socialist Realism. The Leningrad School. - Saint-Petersburg: NP-Print Edition, 2007. - , .
 Anniversary Directory graduates of Saint Petersburg State Academic Institute of Painting, Sculpture, and Architecture named after Ilya Repin, Russian Academy of Arts. 1915 - 2005. - Saint Petersburg: Pervotsvet Publishing House, 2007.

Art
Soviet Union